Nea Alikarnassos (meaning New Halicarnassus) is a town and a former municipality in the Heraklion regional unit, Crete, Greece. Since the 2011 local government reform it is part of the municipality Heraklion, of which it is a municipal unit. The municipal unit has an area of 16.1 km2. Population 14,635 (2011). It is located on the north coast of the island and is served by the Nikos Kazantzakis International Airport. In the settlement of Prassas, the Minoan ruins of two houses were found.

Nea Alikarnassos was founded in 1925 as a public housing development to accommodate the refugees, who were displaced following the Greco-Turkish War.

Heraklion's Hellenic Police headquarters are located within the area. Alongside sits a camp which houses (estimatedly) 500 Romani residents living under poverty conditions, having limited water supply and sewage management.

Politics
The elections reveal a domination of the left wing. In the general elections of 2007 the distribution percentage of representatives were as follows: Panhellenic Socialist Movement (PASOK) 52.85% (2004: 54,54%), the conservative New Democracy 31,22% (2004: 33.84%), the Communist Party of Greece 8.97% (2004: 8.00%), the left Coalition of the Radical Left (SYRIZA) 3.15% (2004: 2.14%), the right Popular Orthodox Rally 1.61% (2004: 1.07%) and the Green Party 1.19%.

Evangelos Sisamakis (PASOK) was first elected mayor in 2003 and was reelected in 2006 with 63% of the votes in the first round.

Culture

Sports
The town of Nea Alikarnassos hosts the Greek football club P.A.S.A. Irodotos F.C., founded in 1932, with presence in Super League Greece 2.

References

External links
Official website (in Greek)

Populated places in Heraklion (regional unit)